Diospyros siamang is a small tree in the family Ebenaceae. The tree is named after its Sumatran name. Habitat is peat swamp forests. D. siamang is found in Sumatra, Peninsular Malaysia and Borneo.

References

siamang
Plants described in 1933
Trees of Sumatra
Trees of Peninsular Malaysia
Trees of Borneo